"All I Want Is You" is a song by Swedish recording artist Agnes. The song was written by Agnes, Ana Diaz, and Jonas Quant. The latter produced the song for Agnes' fourth studio album, Veritas (2012). The song received its radio debut on Sveriges Radio P3 on August 29. It was released as the second single from the album on August 31, 2012.

Background
On July 2012, Agnes debuted the song at her performance at Stockholm Pride. On August 27, 2012, Agnes revealed the release date and artwork for the single. The single was sent to radio stations across Sweden on August 29, one week before the release of her fourth studio album "Veritas". The same day blogger Perez Hilton premiered the lyrics video of the song exclusively on his website and commenting it with "Agnes Doesn't Want Much… All She Wants Is You! And all WE want it more Agnes! Seems like a fair trade to us!" Agnes has self stated that "All I Want Is You" is feverish, and ambiguous, perhaps a declaration of love, but equally a story of obsession.

Music video
A lyric video for the song was released on Agnes official YouTube page on 30 August 2012.

Critical reception
UK blogger, Scandipop, compared the tune with her previous hit "Release Me" saying that "those who wanted something similar to that era will be pleased to learn "All I Want Is You" is a respectful nod back to that sound. Dancepop, with a heavy emphasis on the strings." However he admitted that the sound of the single evolved the appropriate way for the last four years, and he paided homage to producer Jonas Quant, who wrote the song along with Ana Diaz and Agnes herself, for this. JonAli described the song as "an emotional disco anthem with lush strings and a flawless vocal from the Swedish diva." "All I Want Is You” brings us back to the friendly dance beats we are use  to hearing from her hits 'Release Me' and 'Don’t Go Breaking My Heart'."

Track listing
Digital download
 "All I Want Is You" – 3:21

Charts

Release history

References

2012 songs
2012 singles
Agnes (singer) songs
Songs written by Agnes (singer)
Songs written by Jonas Quant